Qorakoʻl District (/Қоракўл тумани) is a district of Bukhara Region in Uzbekistan. The capital lies at the city Qorakoʻl.

The district consists of 1 city (Qorakoʻl), 12 urban-type settlements (Bandboshi, Dargʻabogʻi, Jigʻachi, Qorahoji, Quvvacha, Mirzaqala, Sayyod, Solur, Chandirobod, Shoʻrabot, Yakka A'lam, Yangiqala) and 16 rural communities.

References

Bukhara Region
Districts of Uzbekistan